A tignon (also spelled and pronounced tiyon) is a type of headcovering—a large piece of material tied or wrapped around the head to form a kind of turban that somewhat resembles the West African gele. It was worn by Creole women of African descent in Louisiana beginning in the Spanish colonial period, and continuing to a lesser extent to the present day.

Tignon law
This headdress was the result of sumptuary laws passed in 1786 under the administration of Governor Esteban Rodriguez Miró.  Called the tignon laws, they prescribed and enforced oppressive public dress for female gens de couleur in colonial society.

Historian Virginia M. Gould notes that Miró hoped the law would control women "who had become too light skinned or who dressed too elegantly, or who, in reality, competed too freely with white women for status and thus threatened the social order."

Afro-Créole protest

Miró's intent of having the tignon mark inferiority had a somewhat different effect, according to historian Carolyn Long who noted: "Instead of being considered a badge of dishonor, the tignon ... became a fashion statement. The bright reds, blues, and yellows of the scarves, and the imaginative wrapping techniques employed by their wearers, are said to have enhanced the beauty of the women of color."

The women who were targets of this decree were inventive and imaginative.  They decorated tignons with their jewels and ribbons, and used the finest available materials to wrap their hair.  In other words, "[t]hey effectively re-interpreted the law without technically breaking the law"—and they continued to be pursued by men.

Tignons past and present

The tignon can be wrapped in many ways, and it was and is worn in a different way by every woman. Madras was a popular fabric for tignons among both free and enslaved populations, and has become iconic. Tignons were often created out of mis-matched scraps of undyed fabric given to slaves by their masters. The patchwork of material was made to appear festive.  Tignons worn by free women of color or enslaved women in Haiti, Martinique, Guadeloupe, St. Lucia and Dominica, was made from Madras fabric, even had hidden messages.

The tignon is experiencing a revival in Louisiana. It is found particularly in Creole-themed weddings.  Celebrities such as Erykah Badu and Jill Scott continue to wear headdresses, as a celebration of Afro-American culture.

See also
Head tie

Notes

Headgear